Litani may refer to:
 Litani River (Nahr al-Līţānī; from  Leontes)
 Battle of the Litani River (1941)
 Operation Litani
 Litani offensive
 Litani (Maroni) (or Itany), a river forms part of the boundary between Suriname and French Guiana

See also 
 Litany